The Hamiltonian completion problem is to find the minimal number of edges to add to a graph to make it Hamiltonian.

The problem is clearly NP-hard in general case (since its solution gives an answer to the NP-complete problem of determining whether a given graph has a Hamiltonian cycle). The associated decision problem of determining whether K edges can be added to a given graph to produce a Hamiltonian graph is NP-complete.

Moreover, Hamiltonian completion belongs to the  APX complexity class, i.e., it is unlikely that efficient constant ratio approximation algorithms exist for this problem. 

The problem may be solved in polynomial time for certain classes of graphs, including series–parallel graphs and their generalizations, which include outerplanar graphs, as well as for  a line graph of a tree
or a cactus graph.

Gamarnik et al. use a linear time algorithm for solving the problem on trees to study the asymptotic number of edges that must be added for sparse random graphs to make them Hamiltonian.

References

NP-complete problems
Hamiltonian paths and cycles